Callum Taylor (born 15 January 2002) is an English born professional footballer who played for Southend United. Despite being born in Basildon in Essex, Callum represents Northern Ireland due to his father, who was born in Belfast in 1971. All of Callum’s fathers family were born and are still located in Northern Ireland. Callum joined Southend United at the age of 9 and left in January 2021 after 10 years at the club. He represented the club through every level and made his under 23 debut in 2018.

Club career 
Taylor joined Southend United at the age of 9 in 2011 after a previous spell with West Ham United. This spell was cut short due to a life threatening injury which meant Taylor was out of the game for several years. He played through all the age groups up to under 23’s until his debut. Taylor made his under 23 debut in September 2018, in which he kept a clean sheet in a 2-0 victory over Leyton Orient. Taylor made his Southend first team debut on 15 February 2020, coming on as an 86th minute substitute for Mark Oxley in a 2–0 home defeat to Coventry City.

International career
Taylor has represented Northern Ireland at under-15, under-16, and under 17 level as well as being called up to the under 21’s on several occasions. At under 16 level, Taylor represented Northern Ireland in the Victory Shield. He started in a 2-1 win vs Scotland and a 1-0 win against Wales.

Career statistics

References

2002 births
Living people
English footballers
Association football goalkeepers
Southend United F.C. players
English Football League players
Northern Ireland youth international footballers